Howe Glacier is a short tributary glacier draining west into Scott Glacier immediately north of Mount Russell, in the Queen Maud Mountains of Antarctica. It was mapped by the United States Geological Survey from surveys and U.S. Navy air photos, 1960–63, and was named by the Advisory Committee on Antarctic Names for Robert C. Howe of U.S. Navy Squadron VX-6, a photographer on Operation Deep Freeze 1966 and 1967.

See also
 List of glaciers in the Antarctic
 Glaciology

References

Glaciers of Marie Byrd Land